Thomas Joseph Shahan (September 11, 1857 – March 9, 1932) was an American Catholic theologian and educator, born at Manchester, New Hampshire, educated at Collège de Montréal (1872) at the Pontifical North American College, and at the Propaganda Fide in Rome.

In 1909 Shahan was chosen as the fourth rector of The Catholic University of America.

Life
Thomas Joseph Shahan, was born September 11, 1857, the son of Irish immigrants Maurice and Mary Anne Carmody Shahan, in Manchester, New Hampshire. His mother was mentally ill, and his upbringing was primarily influenced by his father and grandmother.  He was an advocate for Irish independence in language, culture, and politics.

Education
After attending public school in Millbury, Massachusetts, he entered the  Sulpician seminary at the College in Montreal in 1872, after which he proceeded to the North American College in Rome in 1878. In 1882, Shahan obtained a Doctor of Divinity decree and was ordained a priest for the Diocese of Hartford, Connecticut. He also studied at the Pontifical Roman Major Seminary (J.U.L., 1889)

Father Shahan served as a curate at St. John the Baptist parish in New Haven, Connecticut, and later as secretary to Bishop Lawrence McMahon of Hartford, and then chancellor of the Diocese of Hartford.

From 1889 to 1891, Shahan studied at the Humboldt University of Berlin (S.T.D., 1891), the Sorbonne and the Institut Catholique de Paris earning a Civil and Ecclesiastical Law licentiate’s degree. He also developed some expertise in Church History.

Teacher 
In 1891, Father Shahan was offered a position as professor of Canon and Civil Law and Patristics at The Catholic University of America, where he also taught Latin. In addition to teaching at CUA, he was editor in chief of the Catholic University Bulletin and also lectured at nearby Trinity College. In an effort to gain more visibility for the University, in 1897, he preached the Lenten Series at St. Patrick's Cathedral in New York.

Professor Shahan was an editor of the Catholic Encyclopedia (published in 1913), editor in chief of The Catholic Historical Review from its foundation in 1915 until 1928, and one of the editors of Universal Knowledge: A Dictionary and Encyclopedia of Arts and Sciences, History and Biography, Law, Literature, Religions, Nations, Races, Customs and Institutions (New York: Universal Knowledge Foundation, 1927).

Rector
Shahan had been among those considered for the position of rector as far back as 1902. In 1909, while Professor of Church History, he was appointed rector, when Pope Pius X declined to release Bishop John Patrick Carroll of the Diocese of Helena, Montana from his see. Some in the academic community raised objections to the appointment based in part on Shahan's seriously impaired hearing. Nonetheless, Shahan was elected as the fourth rector of CUA.
During his tenure as rector, African American students were barred from the university.

He was named a Domestic Prelate in 1909. 
Monsignor Shahan was also president of the Catholic Educational Association in 1909-14.

On September 25, 1910, representatives of a number of service agencies met at The Catholic University of America at Shahan's invitation, and formed the National Conference of Catholic Charities (NCCC) to support and coordinate their efforts. He served as president from 1910-14.

Bishop

In 1914 he was appointed auxiliary bishop of Baltimore, and ordained titular bishop of Germanicopolis. The consecration occurred on 15 November that year at the Baltimore Cathedral. Cardinal James Gibbons was principal Consecrator.

Along with Catholic University sociology professor William J. Kerby and others, Shahan was instrumental in the creation of the National Catholic War Council, an organization of the American Catholic hierarchy founded to address the challenges of World War I. In 1919 it evolved into the National Catholic Welfare Council and is now known as the United States Conference of Catholic Bishops (USCCB).

Bishop Shahan founded the Basilica of the National Shrine of the Immaculate Conception in Washington, D.C. Upon his death in Washington on March 9, 1932, he was buried in the crypt of the National Shrine. To this day, he remains the only person interred at the Basilica.

Honors
 1923: Honorary Doctorate - The Catholic University of Louvain
 1926: Fellow - Medieval Academy of America
 1928: Honorary Doctorate - Georgetown University

Published works

As author
 The Blessed Virgin in the Catacombs (1892)
 The Civil Law of Rome Catholic University of America Press (1896)
 Giovanni Batista de Rossi (1900)
 The Beginnings of Christianity (1903)
 The Middle Ages (1904)
 The House of God and Other Addresses and Studies (1905)
 St. Patrick in History (1905)
 The Catholic University of America (1889-1916) (Paulist Press) (1916)
 "The Cause of Ireland", The Catholic University Bulletin, December 1920.

As translator
 Otto Bardenhewer, Patrology: The Lives and Works of the Fathers of the Church; translated from the second edition by Thomas J. Shahan. Freiburg im Breisgau and St. Louis, Missouri: B. Herder, 1908.

References

External links

 Catholic University of America

1857 births
1932 deaths
20th-century American Roman Catholic theologians
20th-century Roman Catholic bishops in the United States
Presidents of the Catholic University of America
Catholic University of America faculty
American people of Irish descent
People from Manchester, New Hampshire
Fellows of the Medieval Academy of America
Catholics from New Hampshire
Contributors to the Catholic Encyclopedia
Collège de Montréal alumni